Immunodeficiency with hyperimmunoglobulin M is a rare disorder characterized by recurrent infections, low or absent IgG, IgE, and IgA levels, and normal or elevated levels of IgM and IgD.

See also 
 Immunoglobulin M deficiency
 Immunoglobulin M
 Skin lesion
 List of cutaneous conditions

References

External links 

Noninfectious immunodeficiency-related cutaneous conditions